Changanassery or Changanacherry  is a municipal town in Kottayam district in the state of Kerala, India.

History 
The first recorded history on the origin of Changanacherry is obtained from Sangam period literature. According to Sangam era documents, Uthiyan Cheralathan (Perum Chorru Udiyan Cheralathan, Athan I, or Udiyanjeral - AD c. 130) is the first recorded Kera (Chera) dynasty ruler of the Sangam period in ancient South India.

Governance
The city is governed by the Changanacherry Municipal Council.Ms Sandhya Manoj is the chairperson of the municipality and the vice chairperson Mr Binu.

It heads the taluk Kachery (office). It also heads the Munsiff's court and the judicial first class magistrate's court.
Changanacherry assembly constituency was a part of Kottayam (Lok Sabha constituency). However, after the Delimitation Commission's Report in 2005, in order to retain Mavelikkara Lok Sabha Constituency, Changanacherry segment in Kottayam and the neighbouring constituencies in Alappuzha and Kollam districts were put together under Mavelikkara constituency. Sri. Kodikunnil Suresh represents Mavelikkara constituency in Parliament and Sri. Job Michael represents Changanacherry Constituency in the Kerala Legislative Assembly now.

Demographics 

As of the 2011 India census Changanassery municipality has a population of 47,485; the total population of Changanassery UA/Metropolitan region is 127,987. The male population was 61,807, while the female population was 66,180.
 
The literacy rate of Changanassery Agglomeration is 97.56%, which is higher than the national urban average of 85%. The literacy rates for male and female for Changanassery stood at 98.19% and 96.98% respectively. Total literates in Changanassery UA were 113,597, of which males were 54,901 and the remaining 58,696 were females.

The child population (age 0–6) of Changanassery UA is around 9.02% of the total Changanassery UA population, which is lower than the national urban average of 10.93%. The total number of children in Changanassery urban region was 11,550, of which 5,895 were males while the remaining 5,655 children were females.

Education 
There was a Vedic school at Vazhappally Salagramam (Vazhappally Shala)  in ancient times during the rule of the Thekkumkur. It was run exclusively for Brahmins. It is the oldest educational institution in Changanassery on record. The Vazhappally Sala was destroyed by army of Ramayyan Dalawa during the Battle of Changanassery between Thekkumkur and Travancore in 1790.

 St. Berchmans College, Changanassery (June 19, 1922); The college was initially started in a building (now it is a museum) near to St. Mary's Parel Church. It was a junior college affiliated to Madras University. In 1927, graduate courses were started. Travencore University was founded on November 1, 1937 to which the college was then affiliated. Postgraduate courses were started in 1957. St. Berchmans College situated in Changanacherry , Kottayam District, Kerala, is an independent instructive organization associated to Mahatma Gandhi University, Kottayam. This establishment was established in 1922 and is perceived under the UGC Act, 1956. In the fourth pattern of accreditation in 2017-2022, the school was evaluated at A by the NAAC. It was positioned 79 in All India Ranking by National Institutional Ranking Framework (NIRF) in 2020 in the class of College.
 NSS Hindu College, Changanassery (June 1949); The college was started in the rooms provided at the N.S.S. High School and it was shifted to a new building subsequently in 1955. NSS Hindu College, Changanassery, one of the biggest and most seasoned establishments of advanced education in Kerala. Set up in 1947, it is licensed from UGC, NAAC and it is associated to Mahatma Gandhi University. NSS, Changanassery offers 30 courses across 5 streams specifically Vocational, Arts, Hotel Management, Science, Commerce and Banking and across 8 degrees like BA, BSc, B.Com, MA, MSc. Hostel office isn't accessible for its understudies.
 Assumption College, Changanasserry (1950); This college dedicated for Women. Assumption College, affiliated to University of Kerala in 1949, is at present affiliated to Mahatma Gandhi University, Kottayam. Included under section 2(f) and 12 B of the UGC Act, the College was accredited by the NAAC in the year 2000. 
 NSS Training College, Changanacherry

Notable people

See also
Thottackad

References

Bibliography

External links 

 About Changanacherry
 Archdiocese of Changanacherry
 NSS HINDU COLLEGE CHANGANACHERRY
 St Joseph College of Communication
 St. Berchmans College
 Changanassery Municipality

 
Articles containing potentially dated statements from 2001
All articles containing potentially dated statements
Cities and towns in Kottayam district
Tourist attractions in Kottayam district
History of Changanassery
Kingdom of Thekkumkur
Culture of Kerala
Former capital cities in India
Historical Indian regions